Gigabyte Technology (branded as GIGABYTE or sometimes GIGA-BYTE; formally GIGA-BYTE Technology Co., Ltd.) is a Taiwanese manufacturer and distributor of computer hardware.

Gigabyte's principal business is motherboards. It shipped 4.8 million motherboards in the first quarter of 2015, which allowed it to become the leading motherboard vendor. Gigabyte also manufactures custom graphics cards and laptop computers (including thin and light laptops under its Aero sub-brand). In 2010, Gigabyte was ranked 17th in "Taiwan's Top 20 Global Brands" by the Taiwan External Trade Development Council.

The company is publicly held and traded on the Taiwan Stock Exchange, stock ID number .

History

Gigabyte Technology was established in 1986 by Pei-Cheng Yeh.

One of Gigabyte's key advertised features on its motherboards is its "Ultra Durable" construction, advertised with "all solid capacitors". On 8 August 2006 Gigabyte announced a joint venture with Asus. Gigabyte developed the world's first software-controlled power supply in July 2007.

An innovative method to charge the iPad and iPhone on the computer was introduced by Gigabyte in April 2010. Gigabyte launched the world’s first Z68 motherboard on 31 May 2011, with an on-board mSATA connection for Intel SSD and Smart Response Technology. On 2 April 2012, Gigabyte released the world's first motherboard with 60A ICs from International Rectifier.

Products

Gigabyte designs and manufactures motherboards for both AMD and Intel platforms, and also produces graphics cards and notebooks in partnership with AMD and Nvidia, including Nvidia's Turing chipsets and AMD's Vega and Polaris chipsets. Gigabyte's components are used by Alienware, Falcon Northwest, CybertronPC, Origin PC, and exclusively in Technology Direct desktops.

Other products of Gigabyte have included desktop computers, tablet computers, ultrabooks, mobile phones, personal digital assistants, server motherboards, server racks, networking equipment, optical drives, computer monitors, mice, keyboards, cooling components, power supplies, and cases.

Subsidiaries

Aorus is a registered sub-brand trademark of Gigabyte belonging to Aorus Pte. Ltd., which is a company registered in Singapore. Aorus specializes in gaming related products such as motherboards, graphics cards, notebooks, mice, keyboards, SSDs, headsets, cases, power supply and CPU coolers.

See also
 List of companies of Taiwan

References

External links

 
 Gigabyte worldwide distribution partners and retailers
 Official Gigabyte forum
 Gigabyte - Better Business Bureau page

Companies listed on the Taiwan Stock Exchange
Computer companies established in 1986
Computer enclosure companies
Computer peripheral companies
Computer power supply unit manufacturers
Electronics companies established in 1986
Electronics companies of Taiwan
Graphics hardware companies
Manufacturing companies based in New Taipei
Mobile phone manufacturers
Motherboard companies
Multinational companies headquartered in Taiwan
Netbook manufacturers
Taiwanese brands
Taiwanese companies established in 1986
Computer hardware cooling
Gigabyte Technology